Phoma exigua var. exigua is a fungal plant pathogen infecting several hosts.

See also 
 List of potato diseases
 List of tobacco diseases
 List of cucurbit diseases
 List of hydrangea diseases

References

External links 
 Index Fungorum
 USDA ARS Fungal Database

Fungal plant pathogens and diseases
Vegetable diseases
Potato diseases
Tobacco diseases
Ornamental plant pathogens and diseases
Phoma
Fungi described in 1852